Salam is the official debut studio album by the Canadian Muslim singer-songwriter Irfan Makki on Sound Vision label. The album was released on 8 August 2006.

Track listing
The original version of the album contains nine tracks.

References

2006 debut albums
Irfan Makki albums